There are several rivers in the world called the Humber River:

Humber (estuary), Yorkshire, England, on the eastern coast
Humber River (Newfoundland), near Corner Brook in Canada
Humber River (Ontario), Canada, a major river in Toronto with tributaries throughout the Greater Toronto Area

See also 
 Humber (disambiguation)